Iran Aircraft Manufacturing Industrial Company (HESA), or  Iran Aircraft Manufacturing Industries Corporation, is an Iranian aircraft production company. Established in 1976, it belongs to the Iran Aviation Industries Organization (IAIO) and is located at Shahin Shahr, Isfahan. Approximately 2 million square meters or 500 acres of land on which the company is established was gifted by the locally notable and well-regarded Boroumand family (the brothers: Abdolghaffar, Abdolrahman, Abdolrahim, Abdolkarim, Abdolrashid and Abdollah).  The company has thousands of square meters of available grounds, and 250,000 square meters of shops and hangars are allocated to A/C part manufacturing, assembling, laboratories, flight test facilities and shops of preparation for production.

The original factory, built by Textron, was to produce Bell 214s of different configurations in Iran with a deal that involved several hundred helicopters and technology transfers. Reportedly the contract was so huge that a new Textron division had to be founded to meet Iranian demands and handle the program with Major General Delk M. Oden as president. The work ended due to the Iranian Revolution and subsequent sanctions against Iran.

Also known as
The Iran Aircraft Manufacturing Company organization can be known as:
 HESA,
 HESA Trade Center,
 HTC,
 IAMCO,
 IAMI,
 Iran Aircraft Manufacturing Company,
 Iran Aircraft Manufacturing Industries,
 Karkhanejate Sanaye Havapaymaie Iran,
 Hava Peyma Sazi-e Iran,
 Havapeyma Sazhran,
 Havapeyma Sazi Iran,
 Hevapeimasazi

Subsidiaries
Company for Designing and Manufacturing Light Aircraft (high-tech drones).

Products

Jet-propelled aircraft
 HESA Dorna
 HESA Kowsar - a domestic "4th generation" version of reverse-engineered F-5 Tiger.
 Azarakhsh fighter jet (based on Northrop F-5)
 Saeqeh fighter jet (based on Northrop F-5)
 Simorgh: The Simorgh (هواپيماي سيمرغ) is a HESA-built two-seat Northrop F-5A to F-5B conversion. It was first flown in Iran Kish Air Show 2005, and two have been built.
 Qaher313
 Yasin

Propeller aircraft
 IrAn-140 passenger plane with Ukrainian cooperation and based on Antonov An-140.
 Dorna training aircraft
Simorgh transport aircraft
 Shafaq Light Trainer/Light Attack/Light Fighter (based on M-ATF)

Miscellaneous
 Designing and manufacturing parachute recovery system for Ababil drone.  
 Propeller with composite materials
 Manufacturing parts

Rotorcraft
 Shahed 278 helicopter (using components from Bell 206 and Panha Shabaviz 2061)
 Zafar 300 helicopter (based on Bell 206) 
 Shahed 274 helicopter (based on Bell 206)
 Shahed 285 helicopter (using components from Bell 206 and Panha Shabaviz 2061)

Hovercraft
 Hovercraft repairs likely for Islamic Republic of Iran Navy

UAV
 Karrar (UCAV)
 Shahed 136 loitering munition
 Sofreh Mahi
 Shahed 129
 Shahed 149 Gaza
 fʊtros
 ababil

Sanctions
Iran Watch has a helpful compendium of sanctions. HESA has been subject to American sanctions since 2008. The Council of the European Union sanctioned it on 26 July 2010, and HM Treasury on 27 July 2010. On 30 January 2023, the European Union imposed additional sanctions on HESA for providing Russia with UAVs used in the 2022 Russian invasion of Ukraine.

See also 
Iran Aviation Industries Organization
Military of Iran
Islamic Republic of Iran Air Force
List of Iranian Air Force aircraft
Iranian military industry
Current Equipment of the Iranian Army

References

External links

 

Aircraft manufacturers of Iran
Defence companies of Iran
Islamic Republic of Iran Air Force
Manufacturing companies of Iran
Manufacturing companies established in 1976
1976 establishments in Iran
Iranian entities subject to the U.S. Department of the Treasury sanctions